Sex and the Single Ghost is a paranormal romance novel by Tawny Taylor. The novel contains mild bondage. It is a stand-alone novel following the adventure of a Spirit American who has returned to Earth nine years after her death in order to discover why she was murdered.

Plot summary
Claire Weiss was killed in 1995. Although she doesn't remember too much of what happened, she does recall that she was murdered by two thugs while she laid with her soon-to-be husband Matt in bed. After her death, she was stuck in purgatory.

While in purgatory, she discovered that every nine years after a person dies, they can returned to earth around Halloween and live as a mortal. Then, if the Spirit American (that is what ghosts preferred to be called) can help someone on Earth, she or he can have another nine days as a mortal before they were sent back to purgatory.

So she waited nine years to come back to earth in order to discover why she was murdered. Before she returned, she was given a case worker named Bonnie and an emergency phone number in case she needed to contact her. The night she returned to Earth, she reconnected with Jake Faron. The two then work together to discover the truth about Claire's death as well as enjoy the heavenly pleasures Earth has to offer.

Characters in Sex and the Single Ghost

Major Characters
 Claire Weiss: is a Spirit American who was killed in 1995.
 Jake Faron: is a Spirit American who was killed a day after Claire. He was hit by a train while driving his Hummer. Jake admits that he has had feelings for Claire for years, but didn't act on them due to her engagement with Matt.

Other Characters
 Bonnie: is Claire's case worker.
 Matt Gerald: is Claire's ex-fiance.
 Ben Murdock: is Matt's partner at their accountant agency and friend of Claire's.
 Barb: is the administrative assistant at Matt and Ben's agency.

Release details
Trade Paperback: September 2006
Mass Paperback: September 2007

2006 novels
Paranormal romance novels
Fiction about purgatory
American romance novels
Contemporary romance novels